Pierre-Marie Taillepied, Comte de Bondy (7 October 1766 – 11 January 1847) was a French politician who was born in Paris on 7 October 1766 and died in the same city on 11 January 1847.

He sat in the French National Assembly or the House of Representatives in four occasions:
13 May 1815 – 13 July 1815
4 October 1816 – 24 December 1823 
17 November 1827 – 16 May 1830
13 June 1830 – 28 July 1830

References

1766 births
1847 deaths
Politicians from Paris